Davenant is a surname, and may refer to:
 John Davenant (1572–1641), English academic and bishop
 Charles Davenant (1656–1714), English economist, son of William Davenant
 Ralph Davenant, English clergyman
 William Davenant ( 1606–1668), English poet
Davenant may also refer to:

See also

 Davenant Foundation School
 Davenant International 
 Davenant Centre